Anna Hanson Dorsey (1815 – 26 December 1896) was an American author of novels and short stories. A convert to Catholicism, she was a pioneer of Catholic literature in the United States.

Family
Born Anna Hanson in Georgetown, Washington, D.C., she was the daughter of the Rev. William McKenney, a chaplain in the U.S. Navy, and Chloe Ann Lanigan McKenney. In 1837 she married Lorenzo Dorsey, a Baltimore judge. Their only son died fighting on the Union side in the American Civil War. Her daughter, Ella Loraine Dorsey, was an author.

Writing career
Dorsey converted to Catholicism in 1840 and thereafter devoted herself to Catholic literature, mainly in the form of stories and novels, although she wrote a small amount of poetry as well. Her more than 40 novels frequently centered on a religious conversion narrative aimed at her largely Protestant audiences, and her New York Times obituary referred to her as a pioneer of Catholic literature in the United States. Her plots tended towards melodrama, with elements such as mistaken identities, mysterious disappearances, and false accusations.  Her novel Coaina: The Rose of the Algonquins was translated into both German and Hindustani and also made into a stage play. At least two of her novels — The Student of Blenheim Forest (1847) and The Sister of Charity (1850) — were still in print at the end of the century.

Pope Leo XIII twice sent her his benediction, and the University of Notre Dame conferred upon her the Laetare Medal.

She died in Washington, D.C.

Selected works

References

Attribution

Bibliography

Further reading
 Thorp, Willard. "Catholic Novelists in Defense of Their Faith, 1829–1865". Proceedings of the American Antiquarian Society 78, pt. 1 (1968), pp. 25–117.

External links 
 

1815 births
1896 deaths
19th-century American novelists
Converts to Roman Catholicism
Catholics from Washington, D.C.
American Roman Catholic religious writers
Laetare Medal recipients
American women novelists
19th-century American women writers
Wikipedia articles incorporating text from A Woman of the Century